A gilet or body warmer is a sleeveless jacket resembling a waistcoat or blouse. It may be waist- to knee-length and is typically straight-sided rather than fitted; however, historically, gilets were fitted and embroidered. In 19th-century dressmaking a gilet was a dress bodice shaped like a man's waistcoat.

Today, gilets are often worn as an outer layer, for extra warmth outdoors, or indoors on occasion. Fashion gilets may be made of cloth, fake fur, or knitted wool. Sports gilets are often windproof and/or made of fleece. High-end hiking jackets often have an integral gilet inside them, that can be zipped on and off and can be insulated with down. Racing cyclists use thin light gilets with a windproof front and mesh back. Shooting gilets are rugged and made of leather. Short, overwear gilets are called bodywarmers in the United Kingdom.

Gallery

See also

 British country clothing
 Cycling kit
 Jerkin (garment)
 Tabard
 Vest
 Yelek

References

Jackets
Spanish clothing
Tops (clothing)
Vests